Kalinino is a rural locality (a selo) in Novopoltavskoye Rural Settlement, Staropoltavsky District, Volgograd Oblast, Russia. The population was 296 as of 2010. There are 6 streets.

Geography 
Kalinino is located in steppe, 16 km from Novaya Poltavka, 25 km west of Staraya Poltavka (the district's administrative centre) by road. Novaya Poltavka is the nearest rural locality.

References 

Rural localities in Staropoltavsky District